Puerto Rico Highway 339 (PR-339) is a rural road located entirely in the municipality of Mayagüez, Puerto Rico.

Major intersections

See also

 List of highways numbered 339

References

External links
 

339
Roads in Mayagüez, Puerto Rico